JRP may refer to:

Arts, media, and entertainment
 Journal of Research Practice, a biannual open-access academic journal

Businesses and organizations
 Japan Renewal Party, a former Japanese political party
 Japan Restoration Party, a former Japanese political party
 JRP-Ringier, a Swiss publisher of books on contemporary art, formerly known as JRP Editions
 Just Group plc, a British retirement products company, formerly known as JRP Group

Transportation
 Jackie Robinson Parkway, New York City, New York, United States
 Japan Rail Pass, a Japan Railways pass for overseas visitors